David Sencar (born 29 January 1984) is an Austrian professional association football coach and a former player. He played as a midfielder. He is an assistant coach with SV Kapfenberg.

References

1984 births
Living people
Austrian footballers
Association football midfielders
Austrian Football Bundesliga players
2. Liga (Austria) players
Grazer AK players
TSV Hartberg players
First Vienna FC players
Kapfenberger SV players
Austrian football managers